The 1971 Canadian-American Challenge Cup was the sixth season of the Can-Am auto racing series.  It was contested by FIA Group 7 two-seater racing cars competing in two-hour sprint races. The series began on 13 June  1971 and ended on 31 October 1971, after ten rounds. The series was given official recognition by the Fédération Internationale de l'Automobile for the first time in 1971. 

The series was won by Peter Revson driving a McLaren M8F for McLaren Cars.

Schedule

Race results

Series standings
Points were awarded to the top ten finishers in the order of 20-15-12-10-8-6-4-3-2-1. Only the best four placings from the first five races and the best four places from the second five races could be counted towards a driver's series total. Points earned but not counted are marked by parenthesis. The fourth-place finish overall of Jo Siffert was determined posthumously as Siffert died in October 1971 at a Formula One race at Brands Hatch.

References

 
 

 
Can-Am seasons
Can-Am